Chapa Dara is the capital of Chapa Dara District in Kunar Province, Afghanistan.

History
In April 2019, it was reported that Chapa Dara had become a refuge for 2,549 families fleeing an advance of the local chapter of the self-styled Islamic State. These families became dependent on aid by the World Food Programme and the United States Agency for International Development.

References

Populated places in Kunar Province